Tomoplagia minattai is a species of tephritid or fruit flies in the genus Tomoplagia of the family Tephritidae.

Distribution
Argentina.

References

Tephritinae
Insects described in 1955
Diptera of South America